Sir John McTaggart, 1st Baronet (15 March 1789 – 13 August 1867) was a Scottish Whig MP in the United Kingdom parliament. He was created a baronet in 1841. The title became extinct upon his death.

He represented Wigtown Burghs 1835–1857.

McTaggart was the eldest son of John McTaggart of Ardwell (d. 1810), whose estate he inherited. He married, in 1811, Susannah Kymer, eldest daughter of John Kymer, of Streatham, Surrey. They had three children:
 John Bell McTaggart (who died before his father in 1849)
 Susanna McTaggart (ca. 1812 – 25 September 1902), her father's heiress, who married in 1839 John Orde Ommanney (d. 1846), son of Sir Francis Molyneux Ommanney. They left an only daughter Marianne Susanna Ommanney (d. 23 April 1914) who married in 1866 Sir Mark MacTaggart-Stewart, 1st Baronet, who took the MacTaggart name.
 Sarah McTaggart, who married in 1853 James Church, of Calcutta.
His sister, Susan McTaggart, married Thomas Flower Ellis. And their grandson, the philosopher John McTaggart Ellis McTaggart was (twice) named after Sir John McTaggart.

References

External links 
 
 and 

Mctaggart, John
Mctaggart, John
Mctaggart, John, 1st Baronet
Mctaggart, John
Mctaggart, John
Mctaggart, John
Mctaggart, John
Mctaggart, John
Mctaggart, John
Mctaggart, John